Champ d'avoine aux coquelicots is a 1890 landscape painting by the French Impressionist Claude Monet. It is now on display in the Musée d'Art moderne et contemporain of Strasbourg, France. Its inventory number is 55.974.0.683.

Champ d'avoine aux coquelicots belongs to a series of five views of fields around Giverny painted in the summer of 1890. It was bought for the museum in 1948. It was one of several works bought with the insurance money from the disastrous 1947 fire of the Musée des Beaux-Arts.

See also
List of paintings by Claude Monet

References

External links 
Champ d’avoine aux coquelicots  on the museum's website

Paintings in the collection of the Strasbourg Museum of Modern and Contemporary Art
Paintings by Claude Monet
1890 paintings
Oil on canvas paintings